Huancano District is one of eight districts of the province Pisco in Peru.

References

1900 establishments in Peru